Live At Saint Olave's Church is a 2003 album by English experimental group Current 93.

Track listing
 Antony and the Johnsons - "You Stand Above Me" – 1:36
 Antony and the Johnsons - "The Lake" – 4:48
 Antony and the Johnsons - "Cripple and the Starfish" – 4:51
 Current 93 - "Judas As Black Moth" – 1:49
 Current 93 - "Sleep Has His House" – 2:54
 Current 93 - "Walking Like Shadow" – 3:27

Personnel
Tracks 1-3
 Anohni – piano, voice
 Maxim Moston – violin

Tracks 4-6
 David Tibet – voice
 Maja Elliott – piano
 Michael Cashmore – guitar

References

Antony and the Johnsons albums
Current 93 albums
Durtro EPs
Split EPs
2003 EPs
Live EPs
2003 live albums